Curious Pastimes (sometimes abbreviated to CP) is an organisation that runs one of the best-known live action role-playing campaigns in the UK. CP is a private, profit-making company headquartered in Moreton in the Wirral in Northern England. The company was formed in 1995, as a break away group from the Lorien Trust.

Curious Pastimes’ ongoing LARP campaign is called Renewal.. The campaign uses its own set of LARP rules, adapted from the Lorien Trust Rules System. Renewal is a "Fest" Game, in which large numbers (typically hundreds) of players interact with one another and with a small number of briefed non-player characters, climaxing in pre-arranged mass battles between roughly even numbers at the two longer events. These battles represent one of the major variations from the Gathering parent-game, being exclusively Player-versus-Monster battles (the Gathering's battles are chiefly Player-versus-Player).

With approximately 800 players attending the main event in August, Renewal is the third-largest fest campaign in the UK, behind the Gathering and Profound Decisions' Empire.

Events
The Renewal Campaign comprises four events each year, culminating in the flagship event, also called Renewal, held every year over the August Bank Holiday weekend. All the events take place on weekends; two of them run from Friday evening to Sunday afternoon, and two, occurring on Bank Holiday weekends, run to Monday afternoon. Curious Pastimes also runs a system for formally approving smaller events (see below) staged by the various participating groups and factions throughout the year.

The events vary in size from 100 to 1000 people and present different aspects of the ongoing Renewal Campaign. The events are:
A battle event (variously titled Crusade, Bastion, Invasion etc.), traditionally on May Day Long Weekend, which will be held on Easter Weekend at Paccar Scout Camp, Chalfont Heights in 2011. The event emphasizes two mass battles against an identified game-plot enemy. The event normally attracts about 400-500 players.
A plot event (titled to give some hint as to the details of the event, as Heart of Darkness, Great Council etc.) on the second or third weekend of June at Barnswood Scout Camp in Leek. The event emphasizes introducing new plot elements, giving players access to significant non-player characters, and distributing in-game information. The event normally attracts about 250-300 players.
Fayre (generally named after the hosting nation, as Fayre of Albion etc.) on the second or third weekend of July at Woodhouse Scout Camp in Bristol. The event is an almost wholly player-led opportunity to trade and interact in-character, and several games and contests are held. The event normally attracts about 250-300 players.
Renewal on the August Bank Holiday weekend at Paccar Scout Camp in Gerrards Cross. The event is promoted as a "catch-all" event with two mass-battles, heavy interaction with plot and non-player characters and extensive opportunities for players to interact with one another. The event normally attracts about 700-800 players.

The May battle event was staged at Bispham Hall Scout Camp in Wigan until 2009, and Renewal was staged at Phasels Wood Scout Camp in Hemel Hempstead from 1998 to 2007. Both events were moved following negative customer feedback regarding the sites. Two smaller-scale events (40-70 players, peaking at 100 in April 2002) entitled Prelude (in March/April) and Aftermath (in September/October) were discontinued after Prelude 2002, due chiefly to rising venue costs.

Curious Pastimes classes itself as a "family-friendly" event, allowing parents to bring along children of any age. All children are entitled to full characters, though only those 16 or over are allowed to participate in the mass battles.

Sanctioned Events
Curious Pastimes offers formal "sanctioning", allowing affiliated groups (generally groups who also participate in the Renewal Campaign) to run their own events within the ongoing Renewal storyline. There are degrees of sanctioning, ranked from ‘Level 1’ (lowest) to ‘Level 3’ (highest); lower-sanctioned events have little effect on the main Renewal storyline but can be organised and run with minimal involvement by the company, while higher-sanctioned events may have a concrete effect on events at main events but need to be extensively co-ordinated with company staff.

The Game World
The game's setting is a unique unnamed fantasy world. The world is more or less Earthlike, and the known, populated continent that hosts the player characters and their communities is a temperate-to-subarctic landmass broadly equivalent to Eurasia.

There are nine intelligent humanoid races in the CP setting: humans, elves, dark elves, dwarves, four "greenskin" races (orcs, ogres, goblins, and trolls) and a variety of animal-human hybrids collectively known as beastmen. All are more or less evenly-distributed across the world's population (and thus player base), with some variation among the different factions.

Factions
The known continent is populated by a number of monarchies, nation-states and confederations known as Factions, modelled very loosely on various real-world historical communities, with influences from fantasy literature, films and other sources, as well as original ideas. The majority of player characters belong to one or other faction, with the exception of a group of non-aligned players collectively labelled "mercenaries." The factions average about 100 in size at Renewal (i.e. 1/8 of the average Renewal turnout of 800), but are presumed to govern (or at least represent) populations in the hundreds of thousands, appropriate to those of equivalent pre-Industrial states.

In real-world terms, each faction is run as a more or less independent club, with a small administrative team assigned by CP and internal In- and Out-of-Character hierarchies. Many of the factions host websites for their members, and several of them stage small-scale "sanctioned" events set in the Renewal continuity. At events, members of a faction camp together; the factions' communal In-Character camps are the major focus of the game, with attacks against fortified camps and diplomatic missions between camps providing much of the storyline at each event.

Within the broad faction concepts stated above may be found a broad spectrum of characters, from the comical to the serious, from a range of historical (or pseudo-historical) backgrounds, and from the mean and humble to the high-heroic. Formally, Renewal is an "Open World" campaign setting, so players are permitted to submit any concept they wish, with the exception that neither gunpowder-weapons nor any more advanced technology are permitted.

See also
Live action role-playing game
List of live action role-playing groups

References

External links

Live-action role-playing games